Richard Johnson (born April 11, 1974) is an American film director who founded Joystick Films in 2005. Johnson wrote and directed the independent drama film TORN in 2008 and the independent action film Razorblade City in 2009. Johnson along with producer Corey Williams won the TOMI Film Festival 2010 Filmmaker spotlight award in Dallas, Texas for the comedy Can't Complain which he directed in 2009. In 2010, Johnson directed the independent feature film King of Baltimore and the short independent films The Charl(Y)ie Factor and Gathering Souls.

Filmography
TORN (2009): writer / director
Can't Complain (2009): director
Razorblade City (2010): writer / director
King of Baltimore (2010): director
The Charl(Y)i.e. Factor (2010): writer / director
Gathering Souls (2010): director

External links
 http://www.exploreharford.com/news/3062/shot-harford/
 http://www.exploreharford.com/news/3371/harford-movies/
 https://www.imdb.com/name/nm3748688/
 https://www.imdb.com/title/tt1569543/
 https://www.imdb.com/title/tt1547625/
http://www.imdb.com/title/tt1735477/
http://www.imdb.com/title/tt1719701/

1974 births
Living people
People from Maryland
Place of birth missing (living people)
Film directors from Maryland